Don Almquist (born July 21, 1929, died March 1, 2022) was an American painter and illustrator.

He was born in Hartford, Connecticut. He was the son of Nils Herbert Almquist (1903–1960) and Jeannette Perrow (1905–1996). He earned a BFA in 1951 from Rhode Island School of Design.

Almquist has exhibited in seven one-man shows and sixteen juried shows in the US, Canada and Sweden while garnering a number of awards.  Earlier in his career, he served as an art and creative director for Ahlen & Akerlund in Stockholm, Sweden, one of the largest and influential publishing houses in Europe, and also as graphics advisor to the US Department of the Interior, Fish and Wildlife Service in Washington, D.C.

References

External links 
 Don Almquist's website 

1929 births
Rhode Island School of Design alumni
20th-century American painters
20th-century American male artists
American male painters
21st-century American painters
21st-century American male artists
American illustrators
Living people